Limassol District or Lemesos is one of the six districts of Cyprus. , it had a population of 239,842, 77% of which was urban. Its main city is Limassol. Part of the British Overseas Territory of Akrotiri and Dhekelia forms an enclave on the Akrotiri Peninsula, under the sovereignty of the United Kingdom.

History
Archaeological excavations have unearthed ruins of the Byzantine period and a tomb of the 7th century BC.

Geography

Limassol District forms much of the southwestern-central part of Cyprus. The Kouris River rises in the southern slopes of Troodos mountains, which lie in the northern part of the district towards the centre of Cyprus, and flows to the sea near the ancient city of Kourion. This river has been dammed by the Kouris Dam, which has caused the near drying up of the river in its lower reaches. Limassol, to the northeast of the Akrotiri peninsula lies on Akrotiri Bay, while Pissouri, to the northwest of the peninsula, lies on Episkopi Bay. Episkopi Bay is a nesting ground for green and loggerhead turtles, both of which are on the IUCN list of endangered species. Amathous Beach, Dassoudi Beach and part of Governor's Beach are also situated in the district.

Settlements
According to Statistical Codes of Municipalities, Communities and Quarters of Cyprus per the Statistical Service of Cyprus (2015), Limassol District has 6 municipalities and 106 communities. Municipalities are written with bold.

 Agios Amvrosios, Limassol
 Agios Athanasios, Cyprus
 Agios Dimitrios, Cyprus
 Agios Georgios, Limassol
 Agios Ioannis, Limassol
 Agios Konstantinos, Cyprus
 Agios Mamas, Limassol
 Agios Pavlos, Cyprus
 Agios Theodoros, Limassol
 Agios Therapon
 Agios Thomas, Cyprus
 Agios Tychonas
 Agridia
 Agros, Cyprus
 Akapnou
 Akrotiri (village)
 Akrounta
 Alassa
 Alektora
 Amiantos
 Anogyra
 Apesia
 Apsiou
 Arakapas
 Armenochori, Cyprus
 Arsos, Limassol
 Asgata
 Asomatos, Limassol
 Avdimou
 Chandria
 Dierona
 Dora, Cyprus
 Doros, Cyprus
 Dymes
 Episkopi, Limassol
 Eptagoneia
 Erimi
 Fasoula, Limassol
 Foini
 Foinikaria
 Gerasa, Cyprus
 Germasogeia
 Gerovasa
 Kalo Chorio, Limassol
 Kaminaria
 Kantou, Cyprus
 Kapilio
 Kato Kivides
 Kato Mylos
 Kato Platres
 Kato Polemidia
 Kellaki
 Kissousa
 Klonari
 Koilani
 Kolossi
 Korfi
 Kouka, Cyprus
 Kyperounta
 Laneia
 Lemithou
 Limassol
 Limnatis, Limassol
 Lofou
 Louvaras
 Malia, Cyprus
 Mandria, Limassol
 Mathikoloni
 Mesa Geitonia
 Monagri
 Monagroulli
 Moni, Cyprus
 Moniatis
 Mouttagiaka
 Omodos
 Pachna
 Palaiomylos
 Palodeia
 Pano Kivides
 Pano Polemidia
 Paramali
 Paramytha
 Parekklisia
 Pelendri
 Pentakomo
 Pera Pedi
 Pissouri
 Platanisteia
 Platres
 Potamiou
 Potamitissa
 Prastio (Avdimou)
 Prastio (Kellaki)
 Prodromos, Cyprus
 Pyrgos, Limassol
 Sanida
 Silikou
 Sotira, Limassol
 Souni–Zanatzia
 Spitali
 Sykopetra
 Trachoni, Limassol
 Treis Elies
 Trimiklini
 Troodos (community)
 Tserkezoi
 Vasa Kellakiou
 Vasa Koilaniou
 Vikla
 Vouni
 Ypsonas
 Zoopigi

Quarters 
The municipalities of Limassol, for administrative purposes, are divided into quarters. An exception is the Ypsonas Municipality. The list below shows alphabetically the quarters per municipality.

Agios Athanasios Municipality
Agios Athanasios
Apostolos Loukas
Agios Georgiou Fragkoudi
Agios Stylianos

Germasogeia Municipality
Agia Paraskevi
Potamos Germasogeias

Kato Polemidia Municipality
Archangelou Michael
Anthoupolis
Apostolos Varnavas
Makarios
Agios Nikolaos
Panayias Evaggelistrias

Limassol Municipality
Agia Zoni
Agia Napa
Agia Trias
Agia Fyla
Agios Antonios
Agios Georgiou
Agios Ioannis
Agios Nektarios
Agios Nikolaos
Agios Spiridonas
Petrou Kai Pavlou
Apostolos Andreas
Arnaoutogeitonia
Zakaki
Κatholiki
Kapsalos
Neapolis
Omonoia
Panayias Evaggelistrias
Tzami Tzentit
Tsiflikoudia

Mesa Geitonia Municipality 
Kontovathkia
Panthea
Prodromos
Halkoutsa

Landmarks
Limassol, as the regional capital and a major centre for European tourism, contains many of the administrative and cultural buildings, and a large number of hotels along the seafront. Limassol District Court is located on Lord Byron Avenue near the Limassol city centre. It consists of a court complex with multiple buildings. The city is known for its wineries, and revelry and nightlife. The Limassol District Archaeological Museum, located in Limassol, has historical artefacts from the towns of Kourion and Amathus. The collections cover several periods, including Preneolithic (Akroteri culture), Early Neolithic (Shillourokambos culture), Neolithic I, Neolithic II (Sotira culture), Chalcolithic, Erimi Culture, Early Bronze Age, Μiddle Bronze Age, Late Bronze Age, Cypro-Geometric period, Cypro-Archaic period, Cypro-Classical period, Hellenistic period, Roman period, and Late Roman/Early Christian/Early Byzantine period. The Painted Churches in the Troödos Region is a UNESCO World Heritage Site, and one of the churches, Timios Stavros (Holy Cross) is situated in Pelendri, Limassol District.

References

Bibliography

External links

 
Districts of Cyprus